Caecilia armata is a species of caecilian in the family Caeciliidae. It is endemic to Brazil. Its natural habitats are subtropical or tropical moist lowland forests, plantations, rural gardens, and heavily degraded former forest.

References

armata
Endemic fauna of Brazil
Amphibians described in 1942
Taxonomy articles created by Polbot